Digama hearseyana is a moth of the family Erebidae described by Frederic Moore in 1859. It is found in India, Nepal, Sri Lanka and Pakistan. Two subspecies are recognized.

Description
The wingspan is about 30 mm. Antennae of male with fasciculate cilia. Head and thorax brownish fuscous and abdomen orange yellow. Forewing pale fuscous clouded with duller fuscous. Basal half of wing spotted with black, four spots on costa, three spots on cell, three spots in interno-medial interspace and two spots in inner margin. Sub-marginal and marginal fuscous bands are irregular and dentate. Hindwings are orange yellow with fuscous marginal patches at apex.

Subspecies
Digama hearseyana hearseyana (India, Nepal, Pakistan, Sri Lanka)
Digama hearseyana similis (north-eastern India)

References

External links
 Species info

Aganainae
Moths described in 1859